Kārlis Jēkabs Vilhelms Hūns, also known as Karl Jacob Wilhelm Huhn and Karl Theodor Huhn (Russian: Карл Фёдорович Гун; 13 November 1831 – 28 January 1877) was a Baltic-German history, genre and landscape painter.

Biography
His father was a parochial school teacher and organist  and he received his general education at the Lutheran School in Riga. In 1850, he went to Saint Petersburg to study drafting and lithography. While there, he began taking evening classes at the Imperial Academy of Arts and was admitted as a full student two years later. His primary instructor was Pyotr Basin. By 1859 the artist already competes for artistic awards. In 1861, he received the title of Artist First-Class and a gold medal. He soon began creating icons in the local churches (notably, the Cathedral of the Intercession in Yelabuga), as well as creating sketches of folk life on behalf of the Russian Geographical Society.

In 1863, he was awarded a fellowship that allowed him to travel in Germany, although he eventually settled in Paris and exhibited at the Salon in 1868. Upon his return to Saint Petersburg in 1872, he was named an Academician and later elevated to a professorship. Over the next few years, he finished work started in Paris and focused on paintings of a religious nature. He was also a member of the "Society of Travelling Art Exhibitions" (Peredvizhniki).

In 1874, he married Vera Monighetti, daughter of the architect Ippolit Monighetti. Unfortunately, that same year, he began displaying symptoms of tuberculosis. On the advice of his doctors, he sought out climates with fresher, healthier air than Saint Petersburg, but the disease progressed and, after living in several locations, he died in Switzerland, aged only forty-five.

Selected paintings

References

Further reading 
 S. N. Kondakov, Список русских художников к юбилейному справочнику Императорской Академии Художеств (List of Russian artists in the Anniversary Book of the Imperial Academy of Fine Arts), Saint Petersburg, Golicke and Vilburg, 1914. 
 A. Eglit, Карл Федорович Гун 1830–1877 : Монография (Karl Huhn: Monograph), Riga, Latvian State Publishing, 1955

External links 

 Biography and pictures of Kārlis Hūns on the site "The History of Latvian Art" 
 Russian Painting: Brief biography and paintings by Hūns.

1831 births
1877 deaths
People from Ogre Municipality
People from Kreis Riga
Baltic-German people
Russian painters
Russian male painters
19th-century Latvian painters
Imperial Academy of Arts alumni
Members of the Imperial Academy of Arts
Awarded with a large gold medal of the Academy of Arts
19th-century deaths from tuberculosis
Tuberculosis deaths in Switzerland